McLoughlin Bros., Inc. was a New York publishing firm active between 1858 and 1920.  The company was a pioneer in color printing technologies in children's books.  The company specialized in retellings or bowdlerizations of classic stories for children.  The artistic and commercial roots of the McLoughlin firm were first developed by John McLoughlin, Jr. (1827–1905) who made his younger brother Edmund McLoughlin (1833 or 4-1889) a partner in 1855. By 1886, the firm published a wide range of items, including cheap chapbooks, large folio picture books, linen books, puzzles, games, paper soldiers and paper dolls. Many of the earliest and most valuable board games in America were produced by McLoughlin Brothers of New York. In 1920 the corporation was sold to Milton Bradley & Company. McLoughlin ceased game production at this time, but continued publishing their picture books. MB itself was purchased by Hasbro in 1984 and merged with Parker Brothers in 1998 to form Hasbro Games. The two became brands of Hasbro until 2009 when they were retired in favor of the Hasbro name.

The company worked with numerous artists of the time, including Sarah Noble Ives, William Bruton, Edward P. Cogger, Enos Comstock, Frances Bassett Comstock, Georgina A. Davis, Henry Walker Herrick, Justin H. Howard, May Audubon Post, Victor Renwick, Ida Waugh, and Lois Williams. These artists created richly colored watercolors as well as pen-and-ink drawings, which were adapted to the printing processes for mass production.

In 1951 the firm, now a division of Milton Bradley, was sold to Julius Kushner. At that time, their collection of original artwork for publication was split between members of the board. A portion of that collection was later donated to the American Antiquarian Society. In 1954, McLoughlin Brothers books were sold to Grosset & Dunlap.

Works published 
 Beverly Gray

References

External links

 Mother Goose in an Air-Ship: McLoughlin Bros. 19th Century Children’s Books from the Liman Collection (exhibition), Brooklyn Historical Society, September 2007 to February 2009
 The McLoughlin Bros. of New York, The Gottesman Libraries, Columbia University
 Uncle Tom's Cabin
 Toy and Picture Books at the University of South Florida
 McLoughlin Brothers Archival Drawings and Prints at the American Antiquarian Society
 McLoughlin Brothers Catalogs, Price Lists, and Order Forms 1860-1949 at the American Antiquarian Society
 
 

Defunct book publishing companies of the United States
Children's book publishers
Companies based in New York City
1828 establishments in New York (state)
American companies established in 1858
Publishing companies established in 1858